Terje Bjørklund (born 2 January 1945) is a jazz pianist and composer.  He was an active jazz pianist until approximately 1980. From then on he has concentrated on composing.

Early life and career 
Bjørklund was born in Narvik. After obtaining his Master's Degree in Musicology at the University of Oslo in 1971, Bjørklund studied composition with Finn Mortensen at the Norwegian Academy of Music (1971–1973).  
Bjørklund has collected his experiences as a jazz musician in the text book Moderne jazzimprovisasjon.
In 1983 he was awarded the Norwegian Jazz Association's highest award: the Buddy prize, for his efforts within Norwegian jazz life.

From 1973 onwards Bjørklund has been employed at the Conservatory of Music in Trondheim.  In 1979 he initiated the Jazz Program at the Conservatory. The Conservatory is now part of The Department of Music at the Norwegian University of Science and Technology) and today Bjørklund is an Associate Professor there, with the responsibility for courses in composition and music theory.

As a composer Bjørklund has primarily been oriented toward serious art music. In many of his works harmony is a main element.  The way in which he handles harmony and sound is reminiscent of modern jazz. 
Bjørklund's music was played at the LOOC Festival "Olympic Winter Land" in Tokyo in 1993.
He was the festival composer during the North Norwegian Festival in 1993 and at the Chamber Music Festival Vinterfestspill. in Røros in 2004.
He was "Artist/Composer of the Week" in the Norwegian national radio station NRK P2 in both 1991 and 2004.

Bjørklund has written a number of commissioned works for choirs, orchestras and chamber music as well as solo settings. Bjørklund has devoted much of his compositional career to writing for string ensembles, a testament to Trondheim’s rich string milieu. Key Bjørklund works include Sarek (1992) and Carmina (2008). The latter was recorded by the Trondheim Soloists and featured on the 2008 release Divertimenti, an album that received three 2009 Grammy nominations.

Additional key Bjørklund compositions include Morene and Narvik for symphony orchestra, Magnificat Requiem, De Profundis and Te Deum for soloists, choir and orchestra. Two violin concertos are also key elements of his output: Arctos for violin and strings (1993), Concerto for violin and orchestra (2010) and the opera Frøken Victoria based on Knut Hamsun’s novel Victoria. Concerto for piano and orchestra saw its premiere on 14 January 2016 by Tor Espen Aspaas and the Trondheim Symphony Orchestra while Bjørklund’s Missa Libera for choir, cello and organ was premiered in Trondheim’s Nidarosdomen in April 2016. Bjørklund has also composed three full-length orchestral crossover works: Norwegian Sanctus (2006), The Wedding (2009) and Sacred Concert (2014). Norwegian Sanctus for jazz soloists, choir and chamber orchestra was premiered at the Molde International Jazz Festival in 2006, and the work was also performed at the 2006 Olavsfestdagene and during the Oslo International Church Music Festival in 2009. The Wedding for jazz soloists and chamber orchestra was a work commissioned by the Trondheim Jazz Festival as a celebration of the 30th anniversary of the Jazz Department of NTNU.

Honors 
1983: Buddyprisen

Works 
Terje Bjørklund has in particular written for strings, partially because of the rich string milieu in Trondheim.  He has also written a series of works on commission for chorus, orchestra and various solo and chamber music groups.  Among these are: Ole Edvard Antonsen, Christian Lindberg, Oslo Philharmonic Orchestra, The Chilingerian String Quartetf, Trondheim Soloists, Marianne Thorsen, Nidaros Cathedral Boys' Choir, Aage Kvalbein, Stig Nilsson, Trondheim Symphony Orchestra and Bjarne Fiskum.

Selected works 
Sarek (1989); for string orchestra. When recorded with The Trondheim Soloists in 1992, Sarek received the following critique in the American music magazine Fanfare Magazine:  "Terje Bjørklund's brief tone poem <…> with vistas of breathtaking expanse and lyrical outpourings that sound, in their strong melodic profile, almost like updated Grieg" This work was played as the opening piece for Anne-Sophie Mutter's USA tour with The Trondheim Soloists in November 2001.
Carmina (1994); for string orchestra. Carmina was released in 2008 on the TrondheimSoloists' CD "Divertimenti." This CD was nominated for 3 Grammy awards in 2009.
 Moréne (1983) and Narvik 2002 (2002); for symphony orchestra
Magnificat, and Requiem for soloists, chorus and orchestra
Arctos (1993); violin concerto
Frøken Victoria (1992); opera – based on Knut Hamsun's novel "Victoria.”
 
In the last few years Terje Bjørklund has also composed two full-evening so-called "crossover works":  
Norwegian Sanctus (2006) for jazz soloists, chorus and chamber orchestra had its premier at the Molde Jazz Festival in 2006.  It was also performed during St. Olav Festival in Trondheim the same year and during the Oslo International Church Music Festival in 2009.
The Wedding (2009) written for jazz soloists and chamber orchestra was a commission from the Trondheim Jazz Festival on the occasion of the 30th anniversary of the founding of the Jazz Program at the Conservatory of Music in Trondheim.
 Bjørklund has recently finished a violin concerto, commissioned by the Trondheim Symphony Orchestra in cooperation with Concerts Norway. The concerto will have its premier on 30 September 2010.

Publications 
 Bjørklund, Terje (2000) Moderne jazz-improvisasjon. 2nd ed. Oslo, Norsk musikforlag. 
 Music and scores are published by the following:  Pizzicato (Italy/Switzerland); Warner/Chappell; Norwegian Music Publishers (Norsk Musikkforlag); Music House Publishers (Musikkhusets forlag); Music Information Center in Oslo (MIC).

Recordings
Bjørklund's music has been released on 3 dedicated CDs:  
“Music for Strings” (Hemera HCD 2923)
“Sacred Music” (MIT CD 0197)
“Silent Tracks” (Arctos CD 0104)

In addition, many of his works are included on other CDs.  A complete list is found on his own website.

References

External links 
 Bjørklund’s website at The Dept of Music, NTNU
Music Information Center (MIC), Oslo. Updated list of works
Terje Bjørklund is a member of the Norwegian Society of Composers
List of works supplied by the National Library of Norway

20th-century Norwegian composers
21st-century Norwegian composers
20th-century Norwegian pianists
21st-century Norwegian pianists
Norwegian contemporary classical composers
Norwegian jazz composers
Norwegian jazz pianists
Musicians from Narvik
1945 births
Living people
Norwegian male classical composers
Norwegian male pianists
Male jazz composers
20th-century Norwegian male musicians
21st-century Norwegian male musicians
20th-century jazz composers
21st-century jazz composers